Usho (also spelled Ushu) is a village in Usho Valley, Khyber Pakhtunkhwa province of Pakistan. It is accessible through a non metalled road from Kalam by jeeps only.

Usho is known for its beautiful cloudy and rainy forest.
In winter, the famous Ushu glacier blocks the only path to the Mahodand lake and this path is only opened again in Summer, when the snow of the glacier melts and the authorities wipe of the remaining snow from the road.

See also
Matiltan
Utror
Gabral
Mahodand

References

''Usho Forest' 

Tourist attractions in Swat
Swat Kohistan
Swat District